The southern New Guinea tree frog (Ranoidea impura) is a species of frog in the subfamily Pelodryadinae. It is endemic to Papua New Guinea. Its natural habitats are moist savanna, freshwater marshes, and intermittent freshwater marshes.

References
 

Ranoidea (genus)
Amphibians of Papua New Guinea
Taxonomy articles created by Polbot
Amphibians described in 1878
Taxa named by Wilhelm Peters
Taxobox binomials not recognized by IUCN